Jo Seong-joon may refer to:

 Jo Seong-joon (footballer, born 1988), South Korean footballer
 Jo Seong-joon (footballer, born 1990), South Korean footballer